ToGetHer (aka Superstar Express) is a 2009 Taiwanese drama starring Jiro Wang of Fahrenheit, Rainie Yang and George Hu. It was produced by Comic International Productions (可米國際影視事業股份有限公司) and directed by Linzi Ping (林子平). It started filming on 4 June 2008 and wrapped in mid-September 2008.

It was first broadcast in Taiwan on free-to-air China Television (CTV) (中視) from 15 February to 3 May 2009, every Sunday at 22:00 to 23:30 and cable TV Gala Television (GTV) Variety Show/CH 28 (八大綜合台) on 21 February to 9 May 2009, every Saturday at 21:00 to 22:30. The last two episodes on GTV were aired together as one episode. A few scenes were filmed in the 100% Entertainment recording studio and the building of Gala Television.

Synopsis
Momo Chen is a quiet and shy girl with Jia Sen as her only friend. She is often forgotten and left behind. Her only interest is to read her manga, "Prince Kashaba." Mars is a superstar whose popularity went downhill after a series of negative publicity incidents. His finances, as a result, go into red alert and he is forced to move out of the company house provided to him and moves into a cheaper place instead. He is also told to attend school while on downtime. On the first day of school for Mars, he arrogantly signs his name onto one of Momo's manga with a permanent marker over a picture of Prince Kashaba. Momo becomes furious and yells at him in front of everyone. Meanwhile, Mars' manager, Yi Zhi, finds him a room for rent in Momo's house. Momo is unaware that the room is being rented until her sister drops the news on her suddenly after school. Both are unaware that it is Mars who is to be their tenant.

Mars gradually befriends Momo and her childhood friend Jia Sen, a swimming captain with the cognitive ability and maturity of an 8-year-old. Momo Chen describes him as "different from us" and "not silly or stupid". Jia Sen earns many medals for swimming and gives them to Momo because he secretly has feelings for her. He refers to Mars as "bad guy" and often gets upset when Momo hangs out with Mars. In the beginning Mars and Momo constantly fight but after going through some challenges together, they finally begin to show their feelings for one another.

Cast

Soundtrack

ToGetHer Original Soundtrack (爱就宅一起 電視原聲帶) was released by Various artists, containing nine songs, in which four songs are various instrumental versions of the five original songs.

Track listing

In addition, there are two songs not included in the original soundtrack: The opening theme song, which is "越來越愛" or "Loves You More And More" and the ending theme song "默默" or "Silently", both by Fahrenheit from their 3rd album Love You More and More.

Books
 ToGetHer Love Box - Novel + Making Book (愛就宅一起戀愛寶盒-純愛小說＋戀愛大作戰) - 
 ToGetHer Photobook (愛就宅一起甜蜜寫真) -

Reception

Rival dramas on air at the same time：
 Taiwan Television (TTV) (台視): My Queen
 Chinese Television System (CTS) (華視): Prince+Princess2 (王子看見二公主) / Knock Knock Loving You

International broadcasts

Controversy
On 15 February 2009, the premiere of the first episode of ToGether on China Television (CTV) (中視) was cut by approximately 17 minutes. This led to criticisms on the CTV forum, for not respecting the production team's vision and their creative spirit. CTV defended by stating that they wanted the story to be more compact. On 17 February 2009, Rainie Yang expressed on her blog, of hers and the production team's sadness over the edited first "incomplete" episode and reiterated that the premiere on Gala Television (GTV) Variety Show/CH 28 will be the complete version.

On 20 February 2009, the unaired episode 2 of TogetHer, due for network broadcast on 22 February, was posted on YouTube. Lai Cong Bi (賴聰筆), Deputy General Manager of Gala Television (GTV) expressed that in order to maximise the promotional tour of Jiro Wang, Rainie Yang and George Hu to Singapore, DVD of episodes 1 and 2 were released the previous week in Singapore.

Production credit 
 Screenwriter - Lin Xinhui (林欣慧), Jane Qi (簡奇峯)
 Screenplay coordinator – Qi Xilin (齊錫麟)
 Marketing coordinator – Choi Ji Qiao (蔡紀喬)
 Producer – Wang Xingui (王信貴), Huang Wanbo (黃萬伯)
 Director – Linzi Ping (林子平)
 Post-production director – Zhang Ying-lun (張映綸)
 Executive Producer – Wu Yuqing (吳毓慶) (CTV program manager), Fang Ke Ren (方可人) (GTV Planning Manager), Chen Zhihan (陳芷涵) (GTV Planning Manager), Feng Jiarui (馮家瑞) (Comic International Productions Executive)

References

External links
  GTV ToGetHer official homepage
  GTV ToGetHer blog
  CTV ToGetHer official homepage
  CTV ToGetHer forum

China Television original programming
Gala Television original programming
2009 Taiwanese television series debuts
2009 Taiwanese television series endings